Abbia: Cameroon Cultural Review (fr: Abbia: Revue Culturelle Camerounaise) was an academic journal covering the culture of Cameroon. It was established by Bernard Fonlon and Marcien Towa in 1962 and ran until 1982. Its influence was discussed by Milton Krieger in 1996 and 2014 as well as the contributors to Fonlon's Festschrift 1989. The journal exemplified Fonlon's beliefs about the importance of French-English bilingualism (see his article in Abbia V 4 1963 'A case for early bilingualism').

The full text of Abbia is available on the Vestiges Journal website

References

African studies journals
Cultural journals
Cameroonian culture
Publications established in 1962
1962 establishments in Cameroon
Defunct academic journals published in Africa
Council for the Development of Social Science Research in Africa academic journals